Shaun Terence Young (20 June 1915 – 7 September 1994) was an Irish film director and screenwriter who worked in the United Kingdom, Europe and Hollywood. He is best known for directing three James Bond films, including the first two films in the series, Dr. No (1962) and From Russia with Love (1963), as well as Thunderball (1965). His other films include the Audrey Hepburn thrillers Wait Until Dark (1967) and Bloodline (1979), the historical drama Mayerling (1968), the infamous Korean War epic Inchon (1981), and the Charles Bronson films Cold Sweat (1970), Red Sun (1971), and The Valachi Papers (1972).

Early life and education 
Of Irish descent, Young was born in Shanghai, China, the son of a police commissioner of the Shanghai Municipal Police. His family moved back to England when he was young, and he was educated at Harrow School in London. He read oriental history at St Catharine's College at the University of Cambridge. Commissioned in the Irish Guards, Young was a tank commander during World War II where he participated in Operation Market Garden in the Netherlands.

Career 
Young began his career in the film industry as a screenwriter, earning a credit for Brian Desmond Hurst's On the Night of the Fire (1939), A Call for Arms (1940), Dangerous Moonlight (1941), and A Letter from Ulster (1942) and for other directors on Secret Mission (1942), On Approval (1944). In 1946, he returned to assist Hurst again with the script of Theirs Is the Glory, which told the story of the fighting around Arnhem Bridge. Arnhem, coincidentally, was home to an adolescent Audrey Hepburn. During the later filming of Young's film Wait Until Dark, Hepburn and Young joked that he had been shelling his favourite star without even knowing it. Young worked on the screenplays for Hurst's Hungry Hill (1947) and David McDonald's Bad Lord Byron (1949).

Director 
Young's first sole credit as director (and also Christopher Lee's film debut) was Corridor of Mirrors (1948), an acclaimed film made in France. He followed it with a musical One Night with You (1948); Woman Hater (1948), a comedy with Stewart Granger; and They Were Not Divided (1950), based on his own life in the Irish Guards. Young also directed Valley of Eagles (1951) and The Tall Headlines (1952).

Warwick Films 
Young then made the first film for Irving Allen and Albert R. Broccoli's Warwick Films, The Red Beret with Alan Ladd. Young made That Lady (1955) in Spain with Olivia de Havilland and Storm Over the Nile (1955), an essentially shot-for-shot remake of the 1939 film The Four Feathers. Warwick asked Young back to do Safari (1956), a movie about the Mau Mau, with Victor Mature. For the same company, he did Zarak (1957), also with Mature. MGM hired him to make Action of the Tiger (1957) with Van Johnson; a young Sean Connery had a supporting role. No Time to Die (1958) was Young's fourth film for Warwick, and third with Mature. He made Serious Charge (1959), which was Cliff Richard's film debut; Too Hot to Handle (1960) with Jayne Mansfield; Black Tights (1961) in France; and Duel of Champions (1961) in Italy with Alan Ladd.

James Bond 
Albert Broccoli and Irving Allen had split as a producing team, and Broccoli went into partnership with Harry Saltzman to make a series of films based on the James Bond novels. Broccoli used many of the crew he had worked with during his time at Warwick for the first Bond movies, including Young as director. Young made a crucial contribution to Dr. No (1962), including recruiting Sean Connery to portray Bond. Actress Lois Maxwell later said that "Terence took Sean under his wing. He took him to dinner, to his tailor, showed him how to walk, how to talk, even how to eat."

The movie was a huge success and was quickly followed by From Russia with Love (1963), an even bigger hit. During the filming, Young and a photographer nearly drowned when their helicopter crashed into the sea while filming a key sequence. They were rescued by other members of the film crew. Young was back behind the camera 30 minutes after being rescued. Young was deluged with offers and elected not to direct Goldfinger. Instead he made The Amorous Adventures of Moll Flanders (1965). Young returned for Thunderball (1965), the fourth Bond movie. According to Young, he was offered and turned down the direction of Bond films For Your Eyes Only and Never Say Never Again.

European films 
Following Thunderball, most of Young's work was in Europe. Young directed part of the 1965 espionage portmanteau film The Dirty Game.  He provided the story for Atout cœur à Tokyo pour OSS 117 (1966) and directed the all-star The Poppy Is Also a Flower (1966). He followed this with Triple Cross (1966), and The Rover (1967). Young had a hit with Wait Until Dark with Audrey Hepburn. In a 1967 interview he said his three best films were Black Tights, From Russia with Love and They Were Not Divided. He then directed Mayerling (1968) with Omar Sharif, and The Christmas Tree (1969) with William Holden. He made three films with Charles Bronson: Cold Sweat (1970), Red Sun (1972) and The Valachi Papers (1972).

Later films 
Young's later films include War Goddess (a.k.a. The Amazons) (1973), and The Klansman (1974, replacing Samuel Fuller). He worked on Jackpot but the film was never finished. Later credits include Bloodline (1979), Inchon (1981) about the Battle of Inchon with Laurence Olivier, The Jigsaw Man (1983) with Michael Caine and Olivier (replacing the original director), and Run for Your Life (1988). Olivier and Young had been friends since 1943 when Olivier had initially offered the direction of his film Henry V (1944) to Young, who declined. At the 3rd Golden Raspberry Awards in 1983, he won the Razzie Award for Worst Director for Inchon.

Young contributed to the screenplay for the Hong Kong film Foxbat (1977), which led to him being credited as co-director in some regions. Young was the editor of The Long Days (Al-ayyam al-tawila) (1980), a six-hour Iraqi telenovela about the life of Saddam Hussein, which also led to him being credited as co-director in some regions.

Personal life 
Young's wife was the novelist Dorothea Bennett. He had a son and two daughters. He died of a heart attack while working on a documentary at the age of 79 in Cannes.

Filmography 

 1948: Corridor of Mirrors
 1948: One Night with You
 1948: Woman Hater
 1950: They Were Not Divided
 1951: Valley of Eagles
 1952: The Tall Headlines
 1953: The Red Beret
 1955: That Lady
 1955: Storm Over the Nile
 1956: Safari
 1956: Zarak
 1957: Action of the Tiger
 1958: No Time to Die
 1959: Serious Charge
 1960: Too Hot to Handle
 1961: Black Tights
 1961: Duel of Champions
 1962: Dr. No
 1963: From Russia with Love
 1965: The Amorous Adventures of Moll Flanders
 1965: The Dirty Game
 1965: Thunderball
 1966: The Poppy Is Also a Flower
 1966: Triple Cross
 1967: The Rover
 1967: Wait Until Dark
 1968: Mayerling
 1969: The Christmas Tree
 1970: Cold Sweat
 1971: Red Sun
 1972: The Valachi Papers
 1973: War Goddess
 1974: The Klansman
 1977:  Foxbat
 1979: Bloodline
 1981: Inchon
 1984: The Jigsaw Man
 1988: Run for Your Life

References

Further reading

External links 

 
 
 The Independent, 16 September 1994: Obituary: Terence Young
 New York Times, 9 September 1994: Terence Young, 79; In 1960's, Directed 3 James Bond Films

1915 births
1994 deaths
20th-century British screenwriters
Action film directors
Alumni of St Catharine's College, Cambridge
British Army personnel of World War II
British expatriates in France
British film directors
British male screenwriters
British people of Irish descent
Film directors from London
Film directors from Shanghai
Irish Guards officers